Stand Up.BG or Stand Up Bulgaria is a Bulgarian non-governmental organization and political party which was founded by Maya Manolova on December 6, 2019.

History 
On September 3, 2019, Maya Manolova resigned as national ombudswoman to Bulgaria to run for mayor of Sofia. Manolova founded Stand Up.BG on December 6 of that year. On May 23, 2020, Stand Up.BG organized a protest in front of the Council of Ministers which demanded the resignation of the government. At the protest, Manolova announced that she would run in the 2021 parliamentary election.

The organization participated in the country's anti-government protests. On August 31, 2020, Stand Up.BG announced that it would not become a political party; it would participate in elections as a partner network encompassing dozens of initiative committees from throughout the country. At the end of the year, an agreement on joint participation in the elections was signed with the Poisonous Trio (Otrovnoto trio). The leaders of Stand Up.BG and the Poisonous Trio announced on February 7, 2021 that they would not negotiate with GERB and DPS, and would run instead as a coalition entitled Stand Up! Mafia, Get Out!.

2020–2021 election campaign 

 August 2020: Bulgaria for Citizens Movement president Dimitar Delchev announces the union of his party with Stand Up.BG during a public presentation in Slaveykov Square. Volt Bulgaria party chair Nastimir Ananiev and Movement 21 party chair Tatyana Doncheva does the same. The System Kills Us announces its support for Nikola Vaptsarov as their representative in Stand Up.BG.
 December 29, 2020: Poisonous Trio representative Nikolay Hadjigenov, signs an agreement to participate in the parliamentary elections with Stand Up.BG.
 January 6, 2021: The System Kills Us issues a statement refusing to support "any political or civic formation in the upcoming parliamentary elections that has anything to do with the so-called Poisonous Trio."
 January 17, 2021: In a Bulgarian National Television (BNT) interview, Maya Manolova says that Stand Up.BG "will never, and on no occasion, form a coalition with GERB."
 January 29, 2021: Volt Bulgaria leader Nastimir Ananiev says in a BNT interview that "a coalition will certainly be formed [by us]", and he "firmly excludes" GERB and the Bulgarian Socialist Party from any coalition with Stand Up.BG. Asked about a coalition with There Is Such a People, Ananiev replies, "If we unite in politics" and adds that "the people we can't work with ... are the hidden model that is currently governing. Officially ... that is GERB and the United Patriots, but in fact it is GERB and DPS."
 February 7, 2021: The leaders of Stand Up.BG and the Poisonous Trio announce that they will run together in the elections under the name "Stand Up! Mafia, Get Out!", and they refuse to negotiate with GERB and DPS.
 February 10, 2021: The Poisonous Trio sends an open letter to the chairs of There Is Such A People, Democratic Bulgaria, BSP and DPS, urging them not to "enter into an overt or covert coalition with Boyko Borisov and GERB" and to "negotiate and vote on texts that remove the prosecutor general from the judiciary and establish control mechanisms over the Prosecutor General of Bulgaria", "uphold the country's Euro-Atlantic orientation" and "defend the parliamentary republic."

Electoral history

National Assembly
In the snap April 2021 Bulgarian parliamentary election, the Stand Up! Mafia, Get Out! coalition finished in sixth place with 4.72 percent of the popular vote and 14 seats in the country's 45th National Assembly.

References 

Political organizations based in Bulgaria
Political parties established in 2019
Political parties established in 2022
Social democratic parties in Bulgaria